The first Davao Occidental local elections were held on May 9, 2016, as part of the 2016 general election. Voters selected candidates for all local positions: a town mayor, vice mayor and town councilors, as well as members of the Sangguniang Panlalawigan, the governor, vice-governor, and representative for the Lone District of Davao Occidental.

Background
The province of Davao Occidental held elections for the first time since its creation, and the key positions available were sought by members of just one family: the Bautistas.

Davao del Sur Governor Claude Bautista has two brothers, Franklin and Benjamin, Jr. "Joseph", and a sister, Lorna Bautista Bandigan. All of them ran for positions in the province unopposed.

Franklin is congressman of the 2nd district of Davao del Sur, while Joseph is on his last term as mayor of Malita town in Davao Occidental. On October 12, Lorna Bautista-Bandigan filed her certificate of candidacy for the lone congressional district of Davao Occidental. Bradley Bautista, son of Davao del Sur congressman Franklin, filed for mayor of Malita town, Davao Occidental, seeking to succeed his uncle. Joseph Bautista ran for vice mayor of Davao Occidental.

Results

Governor

Vice-Governor

Representative

Sangguniang Panlalawigan elections

1st Provincial District

|-
|colspan=5 bgcolor=black|

2nd Provincial District

|-
|colspan=5 bgcolor=black|

Mayoral elections

Don Marcelino
John Johnson is term-limited and he is running for Vice Mayor. Michael Maruya is running in his place.

Michael Maruya is term-limited and he is running for Mayor. John Johnson is running in his place.

Jose Abad Santos
James Joyce is the incumbent.

Ester Sioco is the incumbent.

Malita
Joseph Bautista is term limited and he is running for Vice Mayor. His nephew, incumbent Vice Mayor Bradley, is running unopposed.

Bradley Bautista is term limited and he is running for Mayor. His uncle, incumbent Mayor Joseph, is running unopposed.

Santa Maria
Rudy Mariscal, Sr. is the incumbent.

George Mariscal is the incumbent.

Sarangani
Virginia Cawa is the incumbent.

Jerry Cawa is the incumbent.

References

External links
 Precinct Results and Canvassing Results for the 2016 National and Local Elections

2016 Philippine local elections